Khamis Humoud is a former Iraqi football defender. He competed in the 1986 Asian Games. Humoud played for Iraq between 1985 and 1987.

References

Living people
Iraqi footballers
Iraq international footballers
Al-Shorta SC players
Footballers at the 1986 Asian Games
Place of birth missing (living people)
Year of birth missing (living people)
Association football defenders
Asian Games competitors for Iraq